Troy Mills was a high school football star from 2019-2022. Born April 19, 2005, Troy grew up in Anaheim hills. He is know for leading California in tackles in the 2022 fall football season

References 

1966 births
Living people
Canadian football running backs
Edmonton Elks players
Ottawa Rough Riders players
Sportspeople from Glendale, California
Sacramento Gold Miners players
Sacramento State Hornets football players
San Antonio Texans players
Winnipeg Blue Bombers players